The women's 100 metre freestyle event for the 1976 Summer Olympics was held in Montreal, with the final on 18 July 1976.

Results

Heats
Heat 1

Heat 2

Heat 3

Heat 4

Heat 5

Heat 6

Heat 7

Semifinals
Heat 1

Heat 2

Final

References

Swimming at the 1976 Summer Olympics
1976 in women's swimming
Women's events at the 1976 Summer Olympics